Good Luck is a ghost town and former census-designated place in Prince George's County, Maryland, United States.

Established in 1672, the former settlement is currently occupied by the Goddard Space Flight Center and a residential community.

History
Good Luck was a  property deeded to Alexander Magruder in 1672.

In 1702,  of land known as "Good Luck" was sold.

A post office was established in 1817 called "Magruder's".  The post office was renamed "Good Luck" and operated from 1830 to 1852, and from 1872 to 1876.

Decline
In 1871, the village of Glennville (later renamed Glenn Dale) was platted by John Glenn and Edmund B. Duvall.  Located on the Baltimore and Potomac Railroad, Glenn Dale prospered, and in 1876, Good Luck's post office was moved there.  In 1899, Good Luck was described as a "rural village" alongside "the railroad village of Glenn Dale".

"Good Luck Road" is still located at the site of the former settlement, which is currently occupied by the Goddard Space Flight Center and a residential community.

Census designated place
A census-designated place (CDP) called "Good Luck" was established in the general area of the former settlement during the 1970 United States Census. The population of the Good Luck CDP was 10,584. In 1980, Good Luck CDP ceased to exist after the census area was split to create the CDPs of Glenn Dale and Goddard.

References

Former census-designated places in Maryland
Ghost towns in Maryland
Geography of Harford County, Maryland
1672 establishments in the Thirteen Colonies